Unorthodox Behaviour is the first album by British jazz fusion group Brand X. It peaked at 191 on the Billboard 200 in 1976, the same year it was released.

This album combines jazz fusion with progressive rock. It shows extensive use of improvisation in the extended pieces, which is common in both genres of music.

Reception

In a review for AllMusic, Dave Connolly wrote: "Unorthodox Behaviour samples a variety of styles: from melodic to energetic, ethereal to mathematical. Without a standout soloist..., Brand X does run the risk of sounding like a generic fusion jazz outfit, but their compositional skills pick up the slack nicely. Those interested in the band may do well to start with this album."

Markus Scharpey of Genesis News stated: "this is a well-done instrumental debut album. You feel that the musicians are very much in tune with each other. It seems that all tracks were developed from jam sessions and structured later... Phil Collins is on top of his drumming game."

Track listing 
All songs written by Phil Collins, John Goodsall, Robin Lumley, and Percy Jones.

 "Nuclear Burn" – 6:23
 "Euthanasia Waltz" – 5:42
 "Born Ugly" – 8:18
 "Smacks of Euphoric Hysteria" – 4:30
 "Unorthodox Behaviour" – 8:29
 "Running on Three" – 4:38
 "Touch Wood" – 3:03

Personnel 
Credits per insert of original album release on Charisma Records.

 John Goodsall – electric and acoustic guitars
 Robin Lumley – electric and acoustic pianos, Moog synthesizer, string synthesizer on "Nuclear Burn", Echoplex on "Smacks of Euphoric Hysteria"
 Percy Jones – electric and acoustic basses, marimba on "Unorthodox Behaviour"
 Phil Collins – drums, percussion, vibraphone on "Euthanasia Waltz"

 Jack Lancaster – soprano saxophone on "Touch Wood"

Release information

References

1976 debut albums
Brand X albums
Albums with cover art by Hipgnosis
Albums recorded at Trident Studios
Charisma Records albums
Passport Records albums